The 2012 Bahrain 2nd GP2 Series round was the third round of the 2012 GP2 Series. It was held on 27 and 28 April 2012 at Bahrain International Circuit, Bahrain. The first Bahrain round was held a week earlier.

Davide Valsecchi won the feature race, with Rapax driver Tom Dillmann taking his first GP2 Series win in the second sprint.

Classification

Qualifying

Feature race

Notes:
 — Felipe Nasr and Rodolfo González were both issued with twenty-second time penalties after the race for ignoring yellow flags.
 — Jolyon Palmer was classified as having finished the race, as he had completed 90% of the winners race distance.

Sprint race

Notes:
 — Fabrizio Crestani was given a five grid position penalty for ignoring yellow flags during Feature race.
 — Simon Trummer was classified as having finished the race, as he had completed 90% of the winners race distance.

Standings after the round

Drivers' Championship standings

Teams' Championship standings

 Note: Only the top five positions are included for both sets of standings.

Notes

References

Bahrain
GP2